Shorea tumbuggaia is a species of plant in the Dipterocarpaceae. It is native to Andhra Pradesh and Tamil Nadu in India. The species is found widely in Seshachalam and Veligonda hills in Cuddapah and Tirupati hills of Chittoor district of Andhra Pradesh to North Arcot and Chingleput, districts of Tamil Nadu.

Uses
The species is commercially exploited for its timber and therapeutic purposes. The heart wood is similar to sal but much smoother and better for carpentry. Plant parts are to be used as an external stimulant. The plant extracts used to cure ear-aches. Leaf juice is used as ear drops. The bark having anti ulcer activity. The stem is a source of resin, which is used as incense. The resin used to cure duodenal ulcers and amoebic dysentery. It is also used in indigenous medicine as an external stimulant and a substitute for arbutus for children.

References

tumbuggaia
Flora of Andhra Pradesh
Flora of Tamil Nadu
Endangered plants
Taxonomy articles created by Polbot